How Do I Look is a compilation by the Canadian progressive rock band Saga. It was originally released in 1996 only to the German market by the budget label Spectrum. It only covers the albums up to 1989's The Beginner's Guide to Throwing Shapes and also doesn't include anything off the debut Saga, however another Spectrum compilation Wildest Dreams (not to be confused with the album of the same title) included all songs from that LP.

Track listing
All songs written by Saga.

References

Saga (band) albums